The Nuevo León mass graves was the mass murder of over 70 people in the Nuevo León, Mexico on 25 June 2010 in several mass graves. The municipality of Juárez, Nuevo León counts with 51 of the 70 bodies found; most of the bodies were shot dead, while others were burned and mutilated.

See also
List of massacres in Mexico
Mexican Drug War
2011 San Fernando massacre
2011 Durango Massacres
Coahuila mass graves

References

Massacres in Mexico
Organized crime events in Mexico
Mass murder in 2010
Battles of the Mexican drug war
2010 in Mexico